Lynne Ramsay is a Scottish filmmaker.

She is known for her short films, Gasman (1997), and her feature films Ratcatcher (1999), We Need to Talk About Kevin (2011), and You Were Never Really Here (2017). She has received seven British Academy Film Award nominations winning twice for Ratcatcher (1999) and Swimmer (2012). She has also received seven British Independent Film Award nominations and two Independent Spirit Award nominations. She has received four prizes at the Cannes Film Festival and her films We Need to Talk About Kevin (2011) and You Were Never Really Here (2017) competed for the prestigious Palme d'Or.

Major associations

British Academy Film Awards

British Independent Film Awards

Cannes Film Festival

Independent Spirit Awards

Critics awards

References 

Lists of awards received by film director